Ajabaj is a village in the Kajaran Municipality of the Syunik Province in Armenia.

Toponymy 
The village was previously known as Ajaran and Ajaraj.

Demographics 
The Statistical Committee of Armenia reported its population was 30 at the 2001 census.

References 

Populated places in Syunik Province